Dying Is Fun is the debut album by Everyone Is Dirty, released on September 2, 2014 through Tricycle Records.

Track listing
Dirtbag Side-Effect
California
Meltyface
Maman, No!!!
I'm Okay
I Was Born
Lost Thing
Devastate
Isn't It Great
Cheesecake II

Personnel
All Songs Written and Performed by Everyone Is Dirty
All Tracks Recorded and Mixed by Christopher Daddio at Home in Oakland, CA
Mastered by Myles Boisen at Headless Buddha Mastering Lab, Oakland CA
Additional Engineering on Tracks 1,5 & 10 by Gabriel Shepard at Decibelle Recording, SF
Additional Strings on Tracks 4 & 9 by Celia Harris and Tatiana Ecoiffier

References

2014 albums